Mahe railway station (code: MAHE) is a railway station geographically located in Azhiyur, Kozhikode district, serves the Mahe district, Puducherry  and falls under the Palakkad railway division of the Southern Railway zone, Indian Railways. The station consists of two platforms. The platforms are not well sheltered. It lacks many facilities including water and sanitation.

References

External links

Palakkad railway division
Railway stations in Mahe district
Railway stations opened in 1904